Isztimér is a village in Fejér County, Hungary. It incorporates most of the former municipality of Gúttamási.

External links 
 Street map 
 Isztimér.hu

Populated places in Fejér County
Hungarian German communities